1995 Vellore Fort jailbreak was an escape from prison in Vellore, Tamil Nadu, India on 15 August 1995. After digging a  tunnel, 43 LTTE inmates escaped from the prison. 21 of the escapees were re-captured within weeks of the escape.

See also
IPKF
1989 Valvettithurai massacre
Vellore Fort
Vellore

References

Liberation Tigers of Tamil Eelam
Escapes
Prison escapes
Vellore Fort Jailbreak, 1995
Crime in Tamil Nadu